M30 is a Ukrainian international highway (M-highway) formed on 28 April 2021, with the merger of the M04 and the M12. The Stryi-Debaltseve section is part of the European route E50, the section from Debaltseve to the Russian border is part of European route E40 and the section from Oleksandriia to Kropyvnytskyi is part of European route E584. The route was formed before the 30th anniversary of Ukrainian independence. It is also dubbed the Road to Unity.

References

Vinnytsia
Ternopil
Uman
Kropyvnytskyi
Stryi
Khmelnytskyi, Ukraine
Rohatyn
European route E40
European route E50
Roads in Cherkasy Oblast
Roads in Dnipro
Roads in Dnipropetrovsk Oblast
Roads in Donetsk Oblast
Roads in Lviv Oblast
Roads in Luhansk Oblast
Roads in Khmelnytskyi Oblast
Roads in Kirovohrad Oblast
Roads in Ternopil Oblast
Roads in Vinnytsia Oblast